Ludwig van Beethoven, a German composer, died in his apartment in the Schwarzspanierhaus, Vienna, on 26 March 1827 at the age of 56, following a prolonged illness. It was witnessed by his sister-in-law, possibly by his secretary Karl Holz, and by his close friend Anselm Hüttenbrenner, who provided a vivid description of the event. Beethoven's funeral was held three days later, and the procession was witnessed by a large crowd. He was originally buried in the cemetery at Währing, although his remains were moved in 1888 to the Vienna Central Cemetery.

Hüttenbrenner's account has been used to ascribe motivations of resistance and anger to Beethoven in his final moments. Beethoven's last words and the exact cause of his death have also been the subject of some historical debate.

Final illness

Beethoven suffered declining health throughout the last years of his life, including the so-called "Late period" when he produced some of his most admired work. The last work he was able to complete was the substitute final movement of the String Quartet No. 13, Op. 130, composed to replace the difficult Große Fuge, which was published separately as Opus 133. Shortly thereafter, in late 1826, illness struck again, with episodes of vomiting and diarrhea that nearly ended his life.

As it became apparent that Beethoven would not recover, his friends gathered to help and to pay their final respects. Beethoven's doctors conducted four minor operations to relieve ascites (abdominal swelling), of which the first resulted in infection, the others not. On 24 March he was given his last rites, and on 26 March he slipped into unconsciousness and died early that evening. While others, including Beethoven's brother Johann, Karl Holz and some friends were probably in the house, Hüttenbrenner reports in his account given in 1860, that only he and Beethoven's sister-in-law were present in the room at the time of death.

Final words

Beethoven's last recorded words were "Pity, pity—too late!", as the dying composer was told of a gift of twelve bottles of wine from his publisher. Another invention is that his last words were, "I shall hear in heaven," apropos his deafness.

Beethoven biographer Alexander Wheelock Thayer, in his notebook, recorded Hüttenbrenner's account of Beethoven's death. Hüttenbrenner's eyewitness report is sometimes recast to imply that Beethoven "shook his fist at the heavens" in the moment before death. Since any imputations as to the dying man's emotional state are impossible to verify, they tend to be glossed over or ignored as irrelevant by modern Beethoven scholars.

Autopsy and post-mortem findings

An autopsy was performed on 27 March 1827 by Dr. Johann Wagner. While it is unclear who ordered the autopsy, a specific request by Beethoven in his Heiligenstadt Testament may have played a role in the decision. The autopsy revealed a severely cirrhotic and shrunken liver, of which ascites is a common consequence. Scholars disagree over whether Beethoven's liver damage was the result of heavy alcohol consumption, hepatic infection, or both. Hepatitis B and C are causes of cirrhosis, but they spread from contact with contaminated body fluids and were extremely rare in Beethoven's day. Hepatitis A on the other hand can be contracted from food and water that were not handled properly and was very common in the 19th century, although it does not cause liver cirrhosis or permanent organ damage.

Heavy metal contamination is thought to be a contributing factor in Beethoven's death as these were commonly used in medicines of the time. It has also been theorized that he consumed large amounts of lead from illegally fortified wine. Putting lead sugar into wine was a very common practice to sweeten cheap wines, and despite being outlawed in most European countries during the 18th century, the prohibition was difficult to enforce and production of lead-fortified wine (which originated in Roman times) continued unabated. There is no indication the composer had syphilis beyond a mercury treatment prescribed to him around 1815, but these were used for various other ailments as well.

The autopsy indicated damage to his aural nerves as well as hardening of their accompanying arteries, although the latter appears to be consistent with natural aging and not inflammatory damage from syphilis. Beethoven's brain was described as possessing "exaggerated folds", an excess of fluid in the skull, and some thickening of the membranes inside the left ventricle. Scholars believe he may have had a degree of cerebral atrophy, although he showed no sign of cognitive impairment to the end. The skull was described as "possessing unusual thickness".

Beethoven's kidneys had calcareous growths in them, indicating that he was likely developing renal papillary necrosis (RPN). Diabetes is also a cause of RPN, and scholars have not ruled out the possibility that the composer had diabetes mellitus. His spleen was swollen to twice the normal size and he had portal hypertension, both consistent with end-stage liver failure. He also appears to have had severe pancreatitis, as the doctors described his pancreas as "shrunken and fibrous", with the exit duct being very thin and narrowed. Large amounts of reddish fluid had accumulated in Beethoven's abdomen, likely from spontaneous bacterial infections mixed with some blood. This was possibly a result of draining fluid from his abdomen in his last days, a practice that frequently caused infection and often death of the patient in a time before antibiotics and bacterial pathology were known.

In the days immediately preceding and following his death, a number of people, including Anton Schindler and Ferdinand Hiller, cut locks of hair from Beethoven's head. Most of Hiller's lock is now in the Center for Beethoven Studies at San Jose State University. One of Beethoven's friends incorrectly thought that "strangers had cut all of his hair off"; in fact, the apparent lack of hair was due to a cloth cap that covered most of the hair while the body was lying in state.

On 28 March 1827, castings for a death mask were taken. The body was washed, clothed and placed in an oaken coffin, with the head given a wreath of white roses. Beethoven's hands held a wax cross and a lily.

In 1970, Dr. John Spencer Madden, editor of the journal Alcohol and Alcoholism, wrote a post-mortem analysis. This post-mortem became well known by being referenced by a short comical essay by the humorist Alan Coren entitled "Careful, Mr. Beethoven, that was your fifth!"

Funeral and burial

The funeral was held on 29 March 1827 at the parish church in Alsergrund, and he was buried in the Währing cemetery, northwest of Vienna. Many thousands of citizens lined the streets for the funeral procession. As with all crowds, estimates vary, with witnesses reporting anywhere from 10,000 to 30,000 onlookers. Theaters were closed, and many notable artists participated in the funeral procession as pallbearers or torch bearers, including Johann Nepomuk Hummel, Franz Grillparzer who wrote a eulogy, Carl Czerny,  Klemens von Metternich and Franz Schubert. At a memorial mass in a Vienna church on 3 April, Mozart's Requiem was sung with an additional Libera me by Ignaz von Seyfried.

In the days following the funeral, one of the grave-diggers was reportedly offered a substantial sum of money to remove the head from the grave. As a result, Beethoven's friends had a watch put on the grave.

In 1863 Beethoven's body (and also that of Schubert, who was buried nearby) was exhumed, studied and reburied, in proceedings paid for by the Gesellschaft der Musikfreunde. At that time, fragments from the back of his skull, which had been separated during the autopsy, were acquired by the Austrian doctor Romeo Seligmann, which are also now in the Center for Beethoven Studies. His remains were moved in 1888 to the Vienna Central Cemetery.

Lead poisoning overdose
There is dispute about the cause of Beethoven's death; alcoholic cirrhosis, syphilis, infectious hepatitis, lead poisoning, sarcoidosis, and Whipple's disease have all been proposed. In 2008, Austrian pathologist Christian Reiter asserted that Beethoven's doctor, Andreas Wawruch, accidentally killed him by giving him an overdose of a lead-based cure. According to Reiter, Wawruch used the cure to alleviate fluid in the abdomen; the lead penetrated Beethoven's liver and killed him. Reiter's hypothesis however is at odds with Dr. Wawruch's written instruction "that the wound was kept dry all the time". Furthermore, human hair is a very bad biomarker for lead contamination, and Reiter's hypothesis must be considered dubious as long as proper scholarly documentation remains unpublished.

In 2010, Dr. Andrew C. Todd tested two pieces of Beethoven's skull for lead, and determined that the concentration of lead was no greater than would be expected for a normal man of 56 at that time. However, a later study by Dr. Tim White at U.C. Berkeley determined that the tested skull fragments were not Beethoven's.

The leading cause of death still remains lead poisoning, however. Among other evidence, the finding of shrunken cochlear nerves at his autopsy is consistent with axonal degeneration due to heavy metals such as lead. Chronic low-level lead exposure causes a slowly progressive hearing loss with sensory and autonomic findings, rather than the classic wrist drop due to motor neuropathy from sub-acute poisoning. Beethoven's physicians thought that he had alcohol dependence. He particularly liked wine that happened to be tainted with lead, therefore Beethoven's chronic consumption of wine tainted with lead is a better explanation of his hearing loss than other causes.

References

Notes

Sources

External links
Center for Beethoven Studies at San Jose State University, including pages on the Beethoven skull fragments and a lock of hair in the center's possession.

Beethoven, Ludwig
Beethoven, Ludwig
Funerals in Austria
Ludwig van Beethoven
1827 in Europe
March 1827 events